Han Ki-woong is a South Korean actor. He is known for his roles in dramas such as Love to the End, Mother of Mine, Apgujeong Midnight Sun and The Second Husband.

Filmography

Television series

References

External links
 

1987 births
Living people
South Korean male models
21st-century South Korean male actors
South Korean male television actors
South Korean twins